Bothrideridae is a family of beetles in the superfamily Coccinelloidea. They are known commonly as the cocoon-forming beetles or dry bark beetles. They occur worldwide with most native to the Old World tropics. In older literature, the family was often included in the family Colydiidae (e.g.), but is now considered unrelated.

Description

These beetles are 1.4 to 12 millimeters long as adults. They generally have very elongated bodies, some over 4 times longer than wide. They may be cylindrical or somewhat flattened. They are yellow to black in color, some with various patterning and some with red spots. They are hairless to slightly hairy or scaly in texture. The antennae have 9 to 11 segments and are usually club-shaped at the tips. Larvae are up to 18 millimeters long and are elongate in shape.

Biology and ecology

Most beetles in this family live under tree bark. The larvae are ectoparasitoids of other insects, including other woodboring beetles, wood wasps, and carpenter bees.

Taxonomy
Genera that were assigned to the former subfamilies Teredinae, Xylariophilinae, and Anommatinae are now placed into the separate family Teredidae, with members of the former subfamily Bothriderinae constituting the only remaining members of the family. Genera placed in the family in the new circumscription include:
Antibothrus Sharp
Acetoderes Pope
Asosylus Grouvelle
Bothrideres Dejean
Chinikus Pope
Cosmothroax Kraatz
Craspedophilus Heinze
Cylindromicrus Sharp
Dastarcus Walker
Deretaphrus Newman
Emmaglaeus Fairmaire
Erotylathris Motschulsk
Leptoglyphus Sharp
Lithophorus Sharp
Mabomus Pope
Ogmoderes Ganglbauer
Patroderes Ślipiński
Petalophora Westwood
Prolyctus Zimmermann
Machlotes Horn
Pseudantibothrus Pope
Pseudobothrideres Grouvelle
Pseudososylus Grouvelle
Roplyctus Pope
Shekarus Pope
Sosylus Erichson
Triboderus Grouvelle.

References 

 
Coccinelloidea
Polyphaga families